The 1953 Claxton Shield was the 14th annual Claxton Shield, it was held at the Brisbane Exhibition Ground and Davies Park in Brisbane, Queensland from 11 to 19 July 1953. It was the first Claxton Shield held in Queensland. The participants were South Australia, New South Wales, Victoria and Queensland. The Western Australia team, holders of the Shield, were unable to afford the costs to travel to Brisbane. The series was won by New South Wales, their seventh Shield title.

References

1953 in baseball
1953 in Australian sport
1953
July 1953 sports events in Australia